The 1980 CFL Draft composed of seven rounds where 80 Canadian football players were chosen from eligible Canadian universities and Canadian players playing in the NCAA. A total of 18 players were selected as territorial exemptions, with all nine teams making at least one selection in this stage of the draft.

Territorial exemptions

Toronto Argonauts  Phil Jones  DB  Simon Fraser

Saskatchewan Roughriders                         Gene Wall  TB  Saskatchewan

Saskatchewan Roughriders                             Jim Manz                  TB                 Saskatchewan

Winnipeg Blue Bombers                            George Siedel  OT  Montana

Hamilton Tiger-Cats  Don Ross  WR  Acadia

Hamilton Tiger-Cats  Ian Ward  DT  Western Ontario

British Columbia Lions                           Derek Innes               LB                Simon Fraser

British Columbia Lions                               John Pankratz             WR                Simon Fraser

Ottawa Rough Riders                              Gary Cook  SB  Carleton

Ottawa Rough Riders                                  Glenn Cook  CB  Richmond

Calgary Stampeders  Mark Nelson  LB  East Central

Calgary Stampeders                                   Elwood Threlfall  LB  Utah State

Calgary Stampeders                                   Steve Kearns  TE  Liberty Baptist

Montreal Alouettes  Doug Scott  DT  Boise State

Montreal Alouettes                                   Doug Gair  WR  Bishop's

Montreal Alouettes                                   Tim Kist  DE  Manitoba

Edmonton Eskimos                                 Pat Toth  CB  Alberta

Edmonton Eskimos                                     Dale Getty  DB  Weber State

1st round
1. Toronto Argonauts                                 Greg Barrow  OL  Florida

2. Saskatchewan Roughriders                          Jack Hirose  DB  British Columbia

3. Winnipeg Blue Bombers                             Ken Ciancone              LB                  Utah State

4. Saskatchewan Roughriders  Bob Fletcher  P  Northeast Missouri State

5. British Columbia Lions                            Kevin Konar               LB                   British Columbia

6. Ottawa Roughriders  Pat McBride  C  North Dakota State

7. Calgary Stampeders                                Sheldon Paris  QB  Kansas State

8. Montreal Alouettes                                Joe Hawko  QB  Toronto

9. Edmonton Eskimos                                  Ross Francis  DE  Queen's

2nd round
10. Calgary Stampeders                               Ken Vallevand  WR  U.S. International

11. Ottawa Roughriders  Mark Philp                TB                   Richmond

12. Edmonton Eskimos                                 Derry Donaldson  TB  Tulane

13. Ottawa Roughriders                               Neville Edwards           TB                  Western Ontario

14. British Columbia Lions                           Paul Gohier  OT  McGill

15. Toronto Argonauts  Tom Stevenson  TE  Valley City State

16. Calgary Stampeders                               Campbell Hackney          LB                 Simon Fraser

17. Saskatchewan Roughriders  Stewart Fraser  FL  New Brunswick

18. Edmonton Eskimos                                 Dan Kearns                DE                 Simon Fraser

3rd round
19. Winnipeg Blue Bombers                            Rob Bunce                 DE                 Saskatchewan

20. Saskatchewan Roughriders  Charles Toth    DB                 U.S. International

21. Winnipeg Blue Bombers                            Vernon Pahl  G  Prince Edward Island

22. Montreal Alouettes                               Jack Kutasiewich  G  Moorehead State

23. Montreal Alouettes                               Gene Belliveau  DE  St. Francis Xavier

24. Montreal Alouettes                               Ed McMillan  DB  Carleton

25. Calgary Stampeders                               Darcy Krogh  WR  Calgary

26. Hamilton Tiger-Cats                              Eddie Murray   K   Tulane University

27. Edmonton Eskimos                                 Ed Gataveckas             LB              Acadia

4th round
28. Toronto Argonauts                                Robert Kiviranta  DE  Emporia State

29. Saskatchewan Roughriders                         Pat Hamilton              DB              U.S. International

30. Winnipeg Blue Bombers  Brian Perkins             T               Saskatchewan

31. Hamilton Tiger-Cats                              David Yarmolulk           TE              Toronto

32. British Columbia Lions                           Michael Deslauriers       QB              British Columbia

33. Ottawa Roughriders                               Wesley Woof  WR  Wilfrid Laurier

34. Calgary Stampeders  Barry McDonald  C  Montana Tech

35. Montreal Alouettes                               J.P. Normand              WR              Royal Military College

36. Edmonton Eskimos                                 Bob Bridgeman  DT  Windsor

5th round
37. Toronto Argonauts                                Rick Kalvaitis            DT                Wilfrid Laurier

38. Saskatchewan Roughriders                         Larry Harbord             OL                British Columbia

39. Winnipeg Blue Bombers                            Peter Mamer               DE                Saskatchewan

40. Hamilton Tiger-Cats                              Jim Muller                DE                Queen's

41. British Columbia Lions                           Ted Bellinger             WR                Queen's

42. Ottawa Roughriders                               Steve Shubat  T  York

43. Calgary Stampeders                               Jud Mayes                 DB                Boise State

44. Montreal Alouettes                               Mike Washburn             WR                New Brunswick

45. Edmonton Eskimos                                 Francis Sheridan          E                 Queen's

6th round
46. Toronto Argonauts                                David Marinucci           FB                Queen's

47. Saskatchewan Roughriders                         Ron Mackie  LB  Youngstown State

48. Winnipeg Blue Bombers                            Mike Danese               LB                 Toronto

49. Hamilton Tiger-Cats                              Mark Sprague              LB                 Wilfrid Laurier

50. British Columbia Lions  Peter Wilson              C                  Simon Fraser

51. Ottawa Roughriders                               Mike Szemeredy            TE                 Toronto

52. Calgary Stampeders                               George Vasiladis  DE  Waterloo

53. Montreal Alouettes                               Gary Pooler               WR                 Western Ontario

54. Edmonton Eskimos                                 Richard Infantino         DB                 Western Ontario

7th round
55. Toronto Argonauts                                Todd Krohn  T  South Oregon State

56. Saskatchewan Roughriders  Jeff Neal  WR  Saint Mary's

57. Winnipeg Blue Bombers                            Mike Topolovec            DE                  Ottawa

58. Hamilton Tiger-Cats                              Mike Giftopoulos          HB                  Ottawa

59. British Columbia Lions                           Reg Advocat               LB                  Simon Fraser

60. Ottawa Roughriders                               Elwin Worobec  G  Utah

61. Calgary Stampeders                               Brian Meagher  LB/FB  Mount Allison

62. Edmonton Eskimos                                 Anthony Dippolito  DE  McMaster

References
Canadian Draft

Canadian College Draft
Cfl Draft, 1980